Caloptilia sassafrasicola is a moth of the family Gracillariidae. It is known from Fujian, China.

References

sassafrasicola
Moths of Asia